Moussa Soumano (born 9 July 2005) is a French professional footballer who plays as a forward for Ajaccio.

Career
A youth product of Red Star, Souomano moved to Ajaccio in 2021 where he started for their reserves. He made his professional debut with Ajaccio as a starter in a 2–1 Coupe de France win over Jura Sud Foot on 8 January 2023. He scored his first Ligue 1 goal with Ajaccio in a 2–1 win over Angers on 1 February 2023.

Personal life
Born in France, Soumano is of Malian descent.

References

External links
 
 

2005 births
Living people
French footballers
French sportspeople of Malian descent
AC Ajaccio players
Ligue 1 players
Championnat National 3 players
Association football forwards